Israel competed at the 2003 Summer Universiade also known as the XXI Summer Universiade, in Daegu, South Korea.

Medals

Medals by sport

Swimming

Men's

Taekwondo

Men's

References

Summer Universiade
Israel at the Summer Universiade
Israel